Amara Ahmed Ouattara (born 21 October 1983) is a Burkinabé former professional footballer who played as an attacking midfielder.

Club career
Outtara was born in Bobo-Dioulasso, Burkina Faso. After starting professionally in his country with Rail Club du Kadiogo in 2003, Ouattara moved the following year to the Ivory Coast, signing with ASEC Mimosas.

Ouattara then spent the following years in France, always in the lower leagues (Championnat National); he started with AS Cherbourg Football (24 matches and one goal in two half seasons), then US Raon-l'Étape (13 matches in 2007–08) and ÉDS Montluçon.

International career
Ouattara gained his first cap for Burkina Faso in 2003, and was a member of the national team at the 2004 African Nations Cup, as it finished bottom of its group in the first round, thus failing to secure qualification for the quarter-finals.

He also represented the nation at the 2003 FIFA World Youth Championship, as it finished atop in group stage, before bowing out in the round of 16.

References

1983 births
Living people
People from Bobo-Dioulasso
Burkinabé footballers
Burkinabé expatriate footballers
Association football midfielders
Rail Club du Kadiogo players
ASEC Mimosas players
AS Cherbourg Football players
US Raon-l'Étape players
Championnat National players
Championnat National 2 players
2004 African Cup of Nations players
Expatriate footballers in Ivory Coast
Expatriate footballers in France
Burkinabé expatriate sportspeople in France
Burkina Faso international footballers
Ligue 1 (Ivory Coast) players
21st-century Burkinabé people